The headless tambourine is a percussion instrument of the family of idiophones, consisting of a frame, often of wood or plastic, with pairs of small metal jingles.  It differs from the standard tambourine by not having a drumhead.
It creates sound primarily by way of the instrument vibrating itself, without the use of strings or membranes. Headless tambourines come in different shapes with the most common being circular (called jingle ring). It is used in many forms of music, like gospel, pop and rock music. They are called "headless" because they lack the drumhead, that is, the skin stretched over one side of the ring in a traditional tambourine. Jazz, pop and rock drummers sometimes mount a headless tambourine in the drum kit.

References
^ Virginia Tech Department of Music. "Modern Instruments and their Families: Symphonic Classifications in Western Music". Music Dictionary. Retrieved January 22, 2007.

Idiophones
Hand percussion